Arajik Marutjan (born 15 August 1992) is an amateur welterweight boxer who represents Germany. In 2013, he won a bronze medal at the world championships and a silver at the European championships. He was eliminated in the first bout at the 2016 Olympics.

References

External links 

 
 
 

1992 births
Living people
Armenian male boxers
Welterweight boxers
People from Armavir, Armenia
German male boxers
AIBA World Boxing Championships medalists
German people of Armenian descent
Olympic boxers of Germany
Boxers at the 2016 Summer Olympics